Niko Mikkola (born 27 April 1996) is a Finnish professional ice hockey defenceman for the New York Rangers of the National Hockey League (NHL). Mikkola was selected by the St. Louis Blues, 127th overall, in the 2015 NHL Entry Draft.

Playing career
Mikkola made his Liiga debut playing with KalPa during the 2014–15 Liiga season. On 29 May 2017, despite interest from St. Louis to sign his entry-level deal, Mikkola opted to continue his professional career in the Liiga, signing a two-year deal with fellow Finnish outfit, Tappara.

By still harbouring NHL ambitions, Mikkola opted to attend the St. Louis Blues 2017 training camp in preparation for the 2017–18 season. He was assigned back to Tappara after competing in two pre-season contests with the Blues on 25 September 2017. In his only season with Tappara, Mikkola added 2 goals and 11 points in 50 regular season games before helping the club to a silver medal in the post-season, leading the league in plus-minus.

On 1 June 2018, Mikkola agreed to a two-year, entry-level contract with the St. Louis Blues.

During the 2019–20 season, on 7 January 2020, Mikkola made his NHL debut with the Blues against the San Jose Sharks.

Following his second full season with the Blues in 2021–22, Mikkola as a restricted free agent was signed to a one-year, $1.9 million contract extension on 17 July 2022.

During the 2022–NHL season, Mikkola registered three assists through 50 regular season games before he was traded by the Blues on 9 February 2023, alongside Vladimir Tarasenko, to the New York Rangers in exchange for a conditional first-round selection in 2023 NHL Entry Draft and fourth-round selection in 2024, Samuel Blais and Hunter Skinner.

Career statistics

International

References

External links

1996 births
Living people
Finnish ice hockey defencemen
KalPa players
New York Rangers players
People from Kiiminki
St. Louis Blues draft picks
St. Louis Blues players
San Antonio Rampage players
Tappara players
Sportspeople from North Ostrobothnia